Achalinus zugorum is a species of snake described in 2020 from the Ha Giang Province, Vietnam. It is dark in color or iridescent, with scales morphing from blues to greens. Accordingly, the common name Zugs' odd-scaled snake has been coined for this species.

Achalinus zugorum is characterized by its odd non-overlapping scale pattern that differentiates it from all other snakes. It can be distinguished by the formation of its elliptical-looking dorsal scaless, and the absence of labial scales.

References 

Xenodermidae
Snakes of Vietnam
Endemic fauna of Vietnam
Reptiles described in 2020
Taxa named by Thomas Ziegler (zoologist)